Brinsley Colliery was a coal mine in west Nottinghamshire, close to the boundary with Derbyshire, in what is now Broxtowe district.

History
It was opened around 1842.

It closed as a working pit in 1934 when the seams were exhausted. The shafts were kept open until 1970 for access to neighbouring pits.

Production
It was originally sunk to 450 ft (137m). A second shaft was sunk in 1872 to 780 ft (238m), and the tandem headstocks were built with this shaft.

At peak of production, it was producing 500 tons of coal a day, employing 361 men, of whom 282 worked at the coal face.

Current site
It is now reclaimed and is a picnic site and conservation area, east of the fast-flowing busy A608 road between Eastwood and junction 27 of the M1 at Felley.

20th century literature
Arthur John Lawrence (18 June 1847 – 1924), father of David Herbert Lawrence, from Eastwood, worked at the pit. Arthur Lawrence was born in Brinsley. Arthur Lawrence's father, Bert, worked at the pit. DH Lawrence's mother came from a middle-class background. There is also reference of this mine in the short story Odour of Chrysanthemums (DH Lawrence) and this is a focal point of life in the novel

In his book Sons and Lovers, published in May 1913, the colliery is called Beggarlee. In 1999 the Modern Library ranked Sons and Lovers as ninth in their Modern Library 100 Best Novels, with people regarding it as his best book. Beggarlee is also the name of another nearby former pit.

The headstocks of the pit appear in the opening scenes of the 1960 film of the book. The film, directed by Freddie Francis, won the 1960 Academy Award for Best Cinematography.

References

External links
 Lawrence in the East Midlands
 Coal industry in Nottinghamshire
 History of the pit
 The Friends of Brinsley Headstocks

1842 establishments in England
1970 disestablishments in England
Coal mines in Nottinghamshire
D. H. Lawrence
Underground mines in England
British companies established in 1842
Energy companies established in 1842
Borough of Broxtowe